Susan Batson (born February 27, 1943, in Roxbury, Massachusetts) is an American producer, actress, author, acting coach, and a life member of the Actors Studio. Batson graduated from Girls Latin School and Emerson College. 

One of three sisters born to John Batson and Ruth (Watson) Batson (the latter a noted civil rights activist), Susan trained with Harold Clurman, Uta Hagen, Herbert Berghof at HB Studio, and Lee Strasberg. She has coached notable actresses including Academy Award (Oscar)-winning actresses Nicole Kidman and Juliette Binoche.

Batson won the 1971 Obie Award for her performance in AC-DC. On Broadway, she performed in George M! (1968) and The Leaf People (1975), and produced the 2006 production of A Raisin in the Sun. Her work in Adventures of a Black Girl in Search of God won the Los Angeles Drama Critics Award for her.

Filmography

Film

Television

References

External links

Susan Batson at the University of Wisconsin's Actors Studio audio collection
NPR Interview on All Things Considered

African-American actresses
American film actresses
American film producers
American television actresses
American women writers
Actresses from Massachusetts
1943 births
Living people
Place of birth missing (living people)
American acting coaches
20th-century American actresses
American women film producers
20th-century African-American women
20th-century African-American people
21st-century African-American people
21st-century African-American women